Soroca County was a county (Romanian: județ) in Moldova from 1998 to 2003. It bordered Ukraine, and within Moldova, the counties of Edineț, Bălți, and Orhei, and the region of Transnistria. Its capital was the city of Soroca.

References

 Counties of Moldova, Statoids.com

Counties of Moldova
Counties of Bessarabia
1998 establishments in Moldova
2003 disestablishments in Moldova
States and territories established in 1998
States and territories disestablished in 2003